Common Council may refer to:

 The Court of Common Council, an elected body of the City of London Corporation
 Buffalo Common Council, the legislative branch of the Buffalo, NY City Government
 Los Angeles Common Council, the predecessor of the Los Angeles City Council which serves the City of Los Angeles, California today
 A city council in many cities in English-speaking countries